The Royal College of Surgeons in Ireland (RCSI) is a medical professional and educational institution, which is also known as RCSI University of Medicine and Health Sciences, Ireland's first private university.  It was established in 1784 as the national body for the surgical branch of medicine in Ireland, with a role in supervision of training, and as of 2021 provides a broad range of medical education in multiple countries.

RCSI's main campus is situated on St. Stephen's Green and York Street in central Dublin and incorporates schools of medicine, pharmacy, physiotherapy and nursing.  It offers undergraduate and postgraduate education in a number of healthcare fields.

The RCSI achieved Ireland's highest position in the Times Higher Education (THE) University Impact Rankings 2021, coming joint second in the world for ‘Good Health and Wellbeing’ from a total of 871 institutions. THE University Impact Rankings recognise universities around the world for their social and economic impact based on the United Nations' 17 Sustainable Development Goals (SDGs).

History

Background and foundation
Since medieval times, the practice of surgery in Dublin was licensed by one of the Guilds of the City of Dublin, the Barber-Surgeons' Guild, also known at times as the Guild of St. Mary Magdalene. The guild chapel was in Christchurch. Guild membership was obtained by a 3-year apprenticeship, followed by 2 years as a journeyman. In fact the College of Surgeons maintained a mandatory period of apprenticeship to become a qualified surgeon until 1828.

In 1446, the Barber-Surgeons' guild was incorporated by a royal decree of Henry VI, becoming the first medical corporation in Britain or Ireland.

In 1765 Sylvester O'Halloran, a surgeon from Limerick, proposed a College of Surgeons along the lines of the College de St. Cosme in Paris, which had been regulating French surgeons since it had been created by Royal Charter by Louis IX in 1255, to train and regulate surgeons. The Dublin Society of Surgeons was founded in 1780 at the Elephant public house on Essex Street (now Parliament Street).

Trinity did not teach surgery as a subject until 1851, so Ireland was entirely without a school focused on surgery.  To have a separate organization focused on providing standardised surgical education became one of the goals of the society and they lobbied for a Royal Charter, in 1781 presenting the Lord Lieutenant a petition to be incorporated separately from the barbers.  The awaited charter was granted by King George III on 11 February 1784. The governing body, including the first President, Samuel Croker-King, and William Dease, first professor of surgery, met in the boardroom of the Rotunda Hospital for the first time on 2 March.

Non-discrimination
Admission or employment was not subject to discrimination on sectarian grounds. Two of the RCSI's leading founders, Sylvester O'Halloran and William Dease, as well as 11 of its first 57 presidents, were Catholics. The college also recognized the medical qualifications given by the Catholic University from 1856, which gave legitimacy to their diplomas.

18th and 19th centuries
The first candidate for examination was John Birch, in August 1784.

The RCSI's first location, at the corner of York Street, was acquired in September 1805, with additional land at Glover's Alley bought in 1809. The site was previously an abandoned Quaker burial ground. The Duke of Bedford laid the first stone of the new building on St. Patrick's Day, 1806 and building reached completion in March 1810.  As of 2021, this remains the primary location of the institution.

A supplemental charter was granted by Queen Victoria in 1844, dividing medical graduates into Licentiates and Fellows. Initially, physicians were trained alongside surgeons.  In 1886 these two disciplines were merged, and the medical school began operation. As a result of this historical legacy, graduates of medicine still receive Licentiate diplomas from the two Royal Colleges as well as now being awarded MB (Bachelor of Medicine) BCh (Bachelor of Surgery) and BAO (Bachelor of the Art of Obstetrics) degrees by the National University of Ireland.

Now defunct subjects formerly taught include: Logic (1852–1862), Military Surgery (1851–1860) and botany (1792–1889).

20th century
During the 1916 Rising, the main college building on St Stephen's Green was occupied by Irish Citizen Army forces, led by Commandant Michael Mallin and Countess Markievicz. After surrendering, both were tried and sentenced to death. Mallin was executed while Markievicz's sentence was commuted due to her gender.

The subject Hygiene or Political Medicine (1841–1921) was retired, and its Chair united with Medical Jurisprudence.

The RCSI became the first medical institution of learning to offer a 4-year graduate entry programme for medicine in Ireland.

21st century
During the period 2014 – 2018, RCSI affiliated researchers collaborated with over 2,100 international academic and industry institutions producing over 2,900 co-authored publications. The university's field-weighted citation impact is twice the world average and scores in the top decile internationally in the Times Higher Education World University Ranking (2020).

In December 2019, the RCSI was authorised as a university, becoming the ninth in Ireland, following a change in legislation, and an application by the college. The long-sought change in status was complicated by the RCSI's status as a private body but eventually a standard process was created and the college met the conditions set out in it, and following ministerial approval, the change was endorsed by votes in both houses of the Oireachtas.  This also made it the eleventh university on the island of Ireland, including The Queen's University of Belfast and Ulster University.

Associated hospitals
Since the 1980s Beaumont Hospital, Dublin has been the principal centre for medical training. Other affiliated hospitals include teaching hospitals such as Connolly Hospital, Royal Victoria Eye and Ear Hospital, St. Joseph's Hospital, Dublin and University Hospital Waterford.

Academic structure
The institution has a structure of Faculties and Schools, some parts of which focus more on undergraduate studies, some more on post-graduate and continuing professional education.

The lead faculty is the Faculty of Medicine and Health Sciences, with Schools as follows:
 School of Medicine (largest medical school in Ireland; 5- or 6-year undergraduate programme, 4-year Graduate Entry Programme (GEM))
 Schools of Pharmacy and Biomolecular Sciences (undergraduate, including MPharm, and post-graduate, education)
 School of Physiotherapy (undergraduate and graduate-entry, and post-graduate, education)
 School of Nursing & Midwifery (largest post-graduate nursing education provider in Ireland)
 School of Postgraduate Studies (three Masters streams, MD and PhD studies)
and two other units:
 Institute of Leadership
 Centre for Positive Psychology and Health

The other faculties are:
 Faculty of Radiologists (catering to radiologists and radiation oncologists)
 Faculty of Dentistry
 Faculty of Nursing and Midwifery
 Faculty of Sports and Exercise Medicine, operated jointly with the Royal College of Physicians of Ireland

Education is delivered using a structure of departments working across faculties and schools.

Research and innovation
RCSI is home to numerous healthcare research collaborations and centres. The university's research is focused on improving human health through "translational" research: clinical, laboratory-based and health service research informed by societal and global health challenges, and on improved diagnostics, therapeutics and devices; healthcare delivery issues; policy and clinical practice and enhancement of the quality of education of healthcare professionals.

Strategic research themes include:
 Biomaterials and regenerative medicine
 Cancer
 Neurological and psychiatric disorders
 Population health
 Health service issues
 Surgical science and practice
 Vascular biology

Admissions and values
RCSI is a culturally diverse, international organisation with alumni presence in almost every country in the world. More than 3,800 students representing 60 nations are typically enrolled in its Medicine (1,800), Pharmacy (200) and Physiotherapy (100) programmes. RCSI claims to have educated more than 26,000 alumni.

It states that it values innovation, excellence, independence, academic freedom, diversity, tolerance and community and that it champions a patient-centric approach to its activities and endeavours. RCSI is the largest Irish medical school.

Student life
The Students' Union (SU) is an annually elected body, consisting of 8 officers. The SU is the institution's bridge between faculty and the student body and is invited to most meetings, ensuring that student voices are heard on a variety of topics. The SU works closely with the Student Council, which consists of class representatives from all classes at RCSI.

Students at RCSI are encouraged to participate in extracurricular activities that promote service in the community and cultural awareness. 80% of the student population is from outside the European Union, with a significant portion coming from North America, the Middle East and Asia. The Biological Society (BioSoc) is the official student society of the Royal College of Surgeons in Ireland (RCSI) and claims to be the oldest student medical society in the world. The RCSI International Night and the Chocolate Ball (amongst many others) are their main annual events.

RCSI has a sports ground in Dardistown in Dublin's northern suburbs.

International aspects and operations
The RCSI is active in medically-related sectors of education in multiple locations. During the South African Apartheid, for example, the RCSI provided medical education to those that were discriminated against. More than 60 countries from each continent are represented in the RCSI student body.

In Malaysia the RCSI & UCD Malaysia Campus, became the RCSI's "launching pad" in South-East Asia. Established in 1995, medical students may choose to complete their pre-clinical studies at either UCD or RCSI in Dublin, before continuing the clinical aspect of their degree in Penang. Also in Malaysia, Perdana University Royal College of Surgeon in Ireland (PU-RCSI) was established in 2011, aiming to host up to 100 students per year on its 5-year undergraduate medical programme, the first cohort to graduate in 2016.

RCSI-Bahrain is a fully-owned constituent university of the RCSI, the first cohort of its students commencing medical studies in October 2004. Graduates are entitled to a Degree of Bachelor of Medicine, NUI, Bachelor of Surgery, Bachelor of Obstetrics MB, BCh, BAO (NUI, RCSI) degrees.  In 2006, the Medical University of Bahrain established a new School of Nursing which took its first cohort of students in September 2006. Since 2009, students can also obtain the degrees conferred upon RCSI graduates from the National University of Ireland.

In 2005, RCSI Dubai was founded and currently offers a master's programme in Healthcare Management. In 2007, the RCSI, in conjunction with Valentia Technologies, the Dublin Fire Brigade (DFB), and Ireland's Pre Hospital Emergency Care Council (PHECC), launched a unique training initiative with the Emergency Medical Services Dubai Training Institute. The aim is to better patient care and improve response times within Dubai's emergency ambulance services.

For students at the home institution of the RCSI, options may be taken abroad as a result of collaborative agreements with other medical schools around the world. In 2007, these medical schools included Columbia University, University of Pennsylvania, and Tufts University. There are also informal agreements with other institutions such as the Johns Hopkins University and Mayo Clinic.

Motto and colours
The RCSI motto, "Consilio Manuque", was adopted from that of the College de St. Cosme in Paris, which had been afforded the motto by Louis XIV. It was originally "Consiloque Manuque", his personal motto.

Notable alumni

 Professor Abraham Colles of Anatomy, the first person to characterise the injury that was later on known as Colles' fracture
 Felipe Contepomi, former Argentina rugby union international.
 Surgeon Captain Thomas Joseph Crean VC DSO (1873 to 1923), who later achieved the rank of Major.
 Baron Darzi of Denham, Professor of Surgery, Imperial College London, and formerly the British Parliamentary Under-Secretary of State for Health
 Sir Alexander Dempsey, M.D. FRSM, JP, physician, hospital administrator and magistrate.
 Emily Winifred Dickson (13 July 1866 – 1944), the first woman Fellow of any Royal College of Surgeons in Ireland or Great Britain
 Patrick Dignan, major general, director of army surgery, British Army, between 1973 and 1978.
 Sir Ian Fraser (1901-1999), president of the college and president of the British Medical Association, who introduced the widespread use of penicillin into military hospitals during the Second World War
 Nada Haffadh, Bahrain's first female minister when she was appointed Minister of Health in 2004
 Ravi Kant, professor of surgery, Padma Shri award winner(2016) and vice chancellor of King George's Medical University, Lucknow, India.
 Karl Mullen, Irish Rugby Union player and captain of the Grand Slam-winning Irish team in 1948
 Pat O'Callaghan, Irish gold medallist at both the 1928 and 1932 Olympic Games
 Ian Robertson, former star of the Dublin gaelic football team
 Sir William Stokes, knighted for his contribution in the field of surgery.
 Wan Azizah Wan Ismail, first Malaysian to be awarded the MacNaughton-Jones gold medal for Obstetrics and Gynecology in 1977; a MP, the first president of the Malaysian People's Justice Party, the first female Malaysia’s Deputy Prime Minister and wife to current Malaysia’s 10th prime minister, Anwar Ibrahim.
 Sir William Wilde, surgeon, author and father of Oscar Wilde
 T.G. Wilson, President of the RCSI (1958–61), author, founder of the Journal of the College (1963)

Notable honorary fellows 

 Robert Adair (1784)
 Benjamin Bell (1784)
 Percivall Pott (1788, posthumous)
 John Hunter (1790)
 John Abernethy, Astley Cooper, Antonio Scarpa, Samuel Thomas von Sömmerring (1821)
 Georges Cuvier (1831)
 Friedrich Tiedemann (1836)
 Benjamin Collins Brodie (1838)
 Richard Owen (1849)
 William Bowman (1867)
 Samuel Haughton (1873)
 Hermann von Helmholtz (1881)
 Louis Pasteur, Joseph Lister, Thomas Henry Huxley, James Paget, Thomas Spencer Wells (1886)
 John Eric Erichsen, Jonathan Hutchinson (1887)
 Thomas Heazle Parke (1889)
 John Shaw Billings, Hermann Snellen (1892)
 Thomas Joseph Crean (1902)
 Anthony Traill (1905)
 Henri Hartmann, Alfred Henry Keogh, Almoth Edward Wright (1906)
 William Macewen (1912)
 Berkley Moynihan (1913)
 Harvey Cushing (1918)
 Arthur William Patrick Albert (1919)
 William Mayo and Charles Mayo, William Williams Keen (1921)
 Alfred Webb-Johnson (1948)
 Cecil Pembrey Grey (1954)
 Seán T. O'Kelly (1958)
 Benjamin Guinness (1961)
 Éamon de Valera, Arthur Porritt (1964)
 Michael Ellis De Bakey (1967)
 Bryan Guinness, Walter Mackenzie (1968)
 Denis Parsons Burkitt, Francis Daniels Moore (1973)
 Cearbhall O'Dalaigh (1975)
 J. Hartwell Harrison, M.D. (1976)
 Patrick Hillery (1977)
 Robert B. Salter (1978)
 John W. Kirklin (1979)
 Daoud Hanania (1980)
 Abdullah bin Abdulaziz Al Saud (1988)
 Sultan Azlan Shah of Perak (1991)
 Mahathir bin Mohamad (1991), Prime Minister of Malaysia
 Mary Robinson (1994), former President of Ireland
 Emir Shaikh Isa bin Sulman Al Khalifa (1995)
 Mother Teresa of Calcutta (1995)
 Nelson Mandela (1996)
 Alfred Cuschieri (1996), professor
 Seamus Heaney (1998)
 Mary McAleese (1998), former President of Ireland
 Sultan Azlan Shah The Yang Di Pertuan Agong IX (2000)
 Sheikh Maktoum bin Rashid Al Maktoum (2004)
 Bertie Ahern (2006), former Taoiseach
 Bob Geldof (2007)
 Jimmy Carter (2007), former US President

Honorary degrees
The RCSI was granted independent degree-awarding status by the Irish government in 2010, which also allowed the then college, now university, to award honorary degrees. Among others, the following individuals have received honorary doctorates from the RCSI.
 2011: Mary McAleese, President of Ireland (1997–2011)
 2013: The Baron Darzi of Denham, FRCSI, surgeon and former British health minister
 2014: Abraham Verghese - Doctor of Science, professor at Stanford University School of Medicine
 2016: Nezam H. Afdhal, Chief of Hepatology and Director of the Liver Center, Beth Israel Deaconess Medical Centre, Boston and Professor of Medicine, Harvard Medical School; RCSI Class of 1981
 2017: Bennet Omalu, forensic pathologist/neuropathologist, Chief Medical Examiner for San Joaquin County, California, and Clinical Professor of Medical Pathology and Laboratory Medicine, University of California at Davis
 2018: Barbara Murphy, Murray M. Rosenberg Professor of Medicine, Dean for Clinical Integration and Population Health, Icahn School of Medicine at Mount Sinai, New York; RCSI Class of 1989
 2018: Siddhartha Mukherjee, Associate Professor of Medicine, Columbia University Medical Centre, New York
 2019: Sally Davies, Chief Medical Officer for England and Chief Medical Advisor to the UK Government Department of Health and Social Care; professor
 2019: Garret A. FitzGerald, physician and professor at the Perelman School of Medicine of the University of Pennsylvania
 2020: Richard Horton, Editor-in-Chief and Publisher of The Lancet
 2021: Martin Seligman, Zellerbach Family Professor of Psychology and Director of the Positive Psychology Center at the University of Pennsylvania; founder of Positive Psychology as a field of scientific study

Arms

See also
 Faculty of Dentistry of the Royal College of Surgeons in Ireland
 Irish College of Ophthalmologists
 Perdana University Royal College of Surgeons in Ireland
 Royal College of Surgeons of England

References

External links

 
 RCSI Library collections
 e-publications@RCSI, the RCSI institutional repository
 RCSI Surgical Society
 RCSI Students' Union
 RCSI Student Medical Journal (RCSIsmj)
 Beaumont Hospital
 RCSI Dubai
 RCSI Medical University of Bahrain
 RCSI & UCD Malaysia Campus

1784 establishments in Ireland
Learned societies of Ireland
Surgeons in Ireland
Surgical organizations
Medical schools in the Republic of Ireland
National University of Ireland
Educational institutions established in 1784
St Stephen's Green
Seanad nominating bodies
Organisations based in Dublin (city)